Flight 540 may refer to:

Lufthansa Flight 540, crashed on 20 November 1974
ČSA Flight 540, crashed on 20 August 1975

0540